Samuil Martynovich Dudin (1863–1929) was an ethnographer, photographer, artist and explorer. He was a founder of the Ethnographical Department of the Russian Museum in St. Petersburg and a member of several expeditions.

Early life
Dudin was born in 1863 in Rovno in Kherson District in the Southern Ukraine.  His father was a village teacher and, like many other young people at that time, he became a member of a political group connected to the People's Liberty Revolution Party. He was arrested in 1884 and exiled in 1887 to Selenginsk, after which he abandoned his revolutionary activity for ever.

Ethnographic work
While living in exile in Siberia, he began to collect ethnographical materials (which he later gave to the local museum) and to study photography. In 1891, he joined the Orkhon expedition led by Vasily Radloff and after his work there he was pardoned and allowed to return to St. Petersburg.

There he became a student in the Academy of Arts in the class of the painter Ilya Repin, graduating in 1898. Before this, in 1893, he had started a job in the Anthropological and Ethnological Museum in which he remained until the end of his life. At the same time, however, he worked in many other organisations connected to the museum and was a member of several expeditions – such as that led by Vasily Bartold in 1893 and by Sergey Oldenburg to Turfan in 1909-10 and Dunhuang in 1914–15.  He was expedition leader of others (to the Ukraine in 1894; to Samarkand in 1895; to Kazakhstan in 1899; and again to Samarkand in 1905 and 1908). From 1914 until his death in 1929, he was a keeper in the museum's Department of Antiquities of the Orient and Western Turkestan. He produced a great amount of material from each expedition – photographs of the finds and sketches of ethnographical and archaeological objects. This material is now in the collections of many St. Petersburg museums, but is still only partially published.

The photographs are especially interesting. Of particular importance are his photographs of Central Asia taken in the Samarkand region between 1900 and 1902. On Oldenburg's expedition to Dunhuang, Dudin took about 2,000 photographs, sketches and paintings.  Many of these materials, classified by Dudin himself, have been published by the Shanghai Ancient Books Publishing House.

As well as acting as photographer on the expeditions, Dudin also researched and published on the architectural remains and art of Central Asia.

In 1902, Dudin founded the Ethnographical Department of the Russian Museum in St. Petersburg (now an independent museum). The dedication in an issue of the museum's bulletin to his memory reads:

In the same volume Bartold said of Dudin:

And Oldenburg wrote:

Dudin's numerous collections are to be found in many museums in Russia, Siberia and the Ukraine.

References

1863 births
1929 deaths
Archaeologists from Saint Petersburg
Russian ethnographers
Explorers from Saint Petersburg
Photographers  from Saint Petersburg